Tom Sawyer Island is an artificial island surrounded by the Rivers of America at Disneyland, Magic Kingdom and Tokyo Disneyland. It contains structures and caves with references to Mark Twain characters from the novel The Adventures of Tom Sawyer, and provides interactive, climbing, and scenic opportunities. At Disneyland in 2007, the attraction was rethemed and expanded as Pirate's Lair on Tom Sawyer Island, adding references to Disney's Pirates of the Caribbean film series.

History 

The area opened in 1956, one year after the opening of Disneyland Park.

Prior to the debut of Fantasmic! in 1992, when the south end of the Island was re-built to facilitate the nighttime show, Tom Sawyer Island saw very little change. In January 2001, the mock rifles at Fort Wilderness were removed from Disneyland after a six-year-old girl lost part of a finger while playing with one. The Island received major upgrades, new show elements, and a complete re-theming in 2007 when it re-opened as Pirate's Lair on Tom Sawyer Island. The re-theming eradicated much of the previous Tom Sawyer theme in favor of characters and elements from and inspired by the Pirates of the Caribbean film series. A justification behind connecting the Tom Sawyer and pirate themes came in the form of a chapter from The Adventures of Tom Sawyer where Tom, Huck and Joe Harper go off to play pirates on a nearby island, the idea being that all of the Pirates of the Caribbean elements added to the island are all a part of their imaginative play.

Pirate's Lair on Tom Sawyer Island's opening coincided with the theatrical release of Pirates of the Caribbean: At World's End.

On January 11, 2016, Pirate's Lair on Tom Sawyer Island, along with the other attractions and shows along the Rivers of America, closed temporarily for the construction of Star Wars: Galaxy's Edge. Pirate's Lair on Tom Sawyer Island reopened on June 16, 2017.

Geography and features
Guests visit the island, surrounded by the Rivers of America, by traveling on a motorized raft which is piloted by a Disneyland cast member.

While aboard the Sailing Ship Columbia or Mark Twain Riverboat, Disneyland guests travel clockwise around the island. Looking to starboard, they can see the many areas and adventure opportunities of the island. To port, they see Disneyland itself and from time to time will see a Disneyland Railroad train passing by. At the northern end of the island, inaccessible to guests, is the Burning Settler's Cabin, a cabin that used to actually burn by spewing fire from its roof. Despite guest complaints, the park no longer ignites the roof of the cabin with propane each time a watercraft passes by. The Walt Disney World version lasted until 2006, where the pipes (the originals from 1971) were damaged by age and being turned off while the Riverboat was under refurbishment.

Over the years, there have been theme changes to the cabin itself: originally, it was said to have been set afire by a hostile native tribe. This storyline was eventually changed due to complaints from Native American guests, so it was said to have been the home of a moonshiner who had fallen into a drunken stupor when he should have been minding his still; later, after the live flames were eliminated, the fire was described (at least in the Mark Twain steamboat narration) as the result of unspecified carelessness, and as having left not only the cabin's owner homeless, but also some of the local wildlife. In 2007, the outward appearance of the house was cleaned up and all fire damage was removed, making it just another homestead along the waters. Currently, narration (and dialogue from the cabin itself) indicates that it is the home of Mike Fink, keelboater and self-proclaimed "King of the River." When the island reopened in July 2017, the cabin was removed due to the shortening of the island for Star Wars: Galaxy's Edge. A new cabin that does not light on fire was built on the north-most tip of the shortened island as an homage to the original burning cabin. 

The most prominent structure on the island, viewable from Frontierland, Adventureland and New Orleans Square, is Lafitte's Tavern, which was formerly Harper's Mill.

The Landing

The Landing on the island consists of a small dock in which the Rafts to Tom Sawyer Island travel to from the mainland. Guests exit the raft here, and then guests waiting in the dock's small switchback queue enter the raft to travel back to the mainland.

Lafitte's Tavern - Pirate Point

Lafitte's Tavern is the former Harper's Mill which has been part of Tom Sawyer Island since its inception. The outside walls and porch of Lafitte's Tavern features various swords and the salty pirates visiting this place are asked to stow their weapons outside. Despite the Explorer's Map's lively description of the place, Guests cannot actually enter the Tavern.

There was small pirate stunt show that took place on the stage area in front of the Tavern, and between shows The Bilge Rats, a band of pirate musicians, entertained guests with lively sea chanteys.

The Tavern actually houses a lot of show equipment and elements for the nighttime show, Fantasmic!. And beneath the ground that the tavern overlooks is a massive pit that houses the show animatronic Maleficent in her dragon form.

W. Turner Blacksmith

W. Turner Blacksmith features props and show elements reminiscent of the blacksmith shop from Pirates of the Caribbean: The Curse of the Black Pearl in which the character of Will Turner is introduced.

Dead Man's Grotto

Formerly Injun Joe's Cave (featuring a bridge over a bottomless pit along with wind and moan sounds), Dead Man's Grotto infuses more of the Pirates of the Caribbean film mythology into Tom Sawyer Island. The cave features several prominent interactive elements that feature state-of-the-art lighting and sound technology. The first thing guests will note is that Captain Jack Sparrow has left a note of caution for explorers above the entry. The first major interactive feature guests will encounter is the Chest of Davy Jones from the Pirates of the Caribbean films. Upon touching the chest, lighting will change, Davy Jones' disembodied voice will utter words of warning, and guests will be able to feel the heartbeat of Jones' heart from within the chest. Skeletons of previous explorers and pirates litter the pits of the cave, implying danger to those who continue to press onward.

Additional features in the cave include "pop-up" gags featuring Pintel and Ragetti from the Pirates of the Caribbean films who are guarding cursed treasure as well as other effects featuring disappearing treasure and a genie in a bottle guarding treasure.

The end of the Dead Man's Grotto cave features an Audio-Animatronics figure of a cursed pirate prisoner. The pirate's cursed state is in reference to the first Pirates film, but is not representative of any specific character or scene. The cursed pirate comes alive in seemingly random intervals, warning onlookers of the danger of the cursed treasure, asking for help, or sometimes dealing threats. A small, high-up window in the prisoner's cell will occasionally reveal a full moon through the clouds in a dark night sky, which transforms the prisoner into his cursed, undead form.

Smuggler's Cove

Smuggler's Cove is a remnant of the original Tom Sawyer Island, however, has been changed dramatically for the Pirate's Lair makeover. The area now appears to be the site of the wreck of a small sailing vessel which was carrying much pirate loot. Smuggler's Cove features several interactive play features including:

 The Capstan Wheel: When turned by guests, the capstan wheel hoists a treasure chest out of the watery wreckage, with the skeletal remains of a pirate still holding onto his beloved treasure.
 Bilge Pumps: Bilge pumps allow guests to pump out some of the water from the flooded ship, revealing skeletons of long-dead pirates still guarding their treasure in their watery grave.
 Bone Cage: The bone cage serves as a photo-op for guests and is a smaller replica of the bone cages featured in the Pirates of the Caribbean: Dead Man's Chest feature film.
 Suspension Bridge: The suspension bridge is an element from the original Tom Sawyer Island, and crosses overhead, above the bilge pumps and bone cage feature.
 Pontoon Bridge: Rocking and splashing in the water, the pontoon bridge crosses the water for daring explorers near the capstan wheel wreckage.

Castle Rock

Castle Rock is a large rock structure which features stationary telescopes, giving guests views of specific scenery and points of interest back on the Frontierland and Critter Country mainland. The area was mostly unchanged during the Pirate's Lair re-theme, and only features a couple of hidden pirate chests and themed barrels bearing the East India Trading Company stamp.

Pirate's Den - Shipwreck

That official description of the Shipwreck alludes to the Kraken creature featured in the Pirates of the Caribbean films. The shipwreck is a minor feature, only being a small walk-through feature with no interactive elements. Inside the Shipwreck, Davy Jones' ghostly voice can be heard whispering warnings to those who dare inspect the wreckage. The inside of the wreckage features more state-of-the-art LED lighting design, similar to what is seen on a larger scale in Dead Man's Grotto. The wreckage is littered with barnacles, a skeleton, weaponry, and other features from a pirate ship.

The Captain's Treasure

The Captain's Treasure is a large mound of loot at the furthest end of the Island accessible to guests. The area is a photo-op in which guests can pose with the mound of treasure, and often Captain Jack Sparrow can be found posing for photos with guests.

Tom & Huck's Tree House
Tom and Huck's Tree House was the only major guest-accessible feature on the Island not to be notably featured on the Explorer's Map of Pirate's Lair on Tom Sawyer Island. The Tree House was a remnant of the original Tom Sawyer Island theme, and is arguably now irrelevant in regards to the Island's pirate theme, though it does play into the island's new backstory as being a backdrop for Tom and Huck's wildly imaginative pirate playtime. The Tree House was mostly unchanged during the Pirate's Lair re-theme, except for a couple of small pirate additions themed to appear as though Tom and Huck made them in the tree house. When the island reopened after its July 2017 refurbishment, the stairs up the tree house were removed and guests can no longer climb up the tree house.

Fort Wilderness
Fort Wilderness is an original 1956 feature of Tom Sawyer Island. Previously a guest-accessible feature of the island, Fort Wilderness was closed after the island re-opened from a refurbishment in 2003. In 2007 Disney demolished the original 1956 Fort Wilderness due to long-neglected termite and weather damage. A new Fort Wilderness was constructed; however, instead of being constructed with authentic hand-hewn logs, it was built with standard milled lumber. The new Fort Wilderness is not accessible to guests.

Tom Sawyer Islands in other Disney theme parks

Magic Kingdom within Walt Disney World Resort in Florida and Tokyo Disneyland in Japan both have versions of Tom Sawyer Island, still known by their original names. Disneyland Paris and Hong Kong Disneyland have islands, but with alternate themes. In Disneyland Paris, Big Thunder Mountain Railroad occupies the site while Hong Kong Disneyland has Tarzan's Treehouse, which is in Adventureland in a similar location.

See also
 List of Disneyland attractions
 Pirates of the Caribbean (attraction)
 Pirates of the Caribbean (franchise)

References

External links
 Official site (Disneyland)
 Official site (Walt Disney World)
 Official site (Tokyo Disneyland)

Amusement park attractions introduced in 1956
Amusement park attractions introduced in 1973
Amusement park attractions introduced in 1983
Pirates of the Caribbean
Walt Disney Parks and Resorts attractions
Western (genre) amusement park attractions
Disneyland
Magic Kingdom
Tokyo Disneyland
Frontierland
Works based on The Adventures of Tom Sawyer